George Chaworth, 1st Viscount Chaworth of Armagh (c. 1568 – 3 July 1639) was an English  politician who sat in the House of Commons between 1621 and 1624 and was raised to the peerage as Baron Chaworth and Viscount Chaworth.

Background and early life
Chaworth was the son of John Chaworth of Southwell, Nottinghamshire and his wife Jane Vincent. He matriculated at Trinity College, Oxford on 4 March 1586, aged 17 and was admitted to Gray's Inn in 1605. He was knighted at Greenwich on 29 May 1605 and was awarded MA at Oxford University on 30 August 1605.

Career
Chaworth was Constable of Bristol Castle between 1 April 1616 and 1639. The National Archives contains a volume of copy letters, expense accounts and narrative record by him of his mission as privy councillor to Brussels as Ambassador Extraordinary to the Archduchess Infanta Isabel when her husband Albert VII, Archduke of Austria died in 1621. Chaworth was to attempt negotiations for Spain's withdrawal from the Rhine Palatinate, and subsequently to negotiate a treaty with Spain. His account includes observations on his travels in France and the Netherlands.

In 1621 Chaworth was elected Member of Parliament (M.P.) for Nottinghamshire. In 1624 he was elected MP for Arundel. He was created 1st Viscount Chaworth of Armagh, and 1st Baron Chaworth of Tryme on 4 March 1628. His main residence was Wiverton Hall in Nottinghamshire. He was High Sheriff of Nottinghamshire between November 1638 and 1639.

Chaworth died at the age of about 70  at Bath, Somerset and was buried on 15 July 1639 in St. Andrew's Church, Langar, Nottinghamshire.

Family
Chaworth married Mary Knyveton, daughter of William Knyveton and Jane Leeche. They had a son John  who succeeded to the titles.

References

 

1639 deaths
High Sheriffs of Nottinghamshire
Members of the Privy Council of England
Knights Bachelor
Viscounts in the Peerage of Ireland
Peers of Ireland created by Charles I
1560s births
English MPs 1621–1622
English MPs 1624–1625
English knights
Grooms of the Chamber